In Greek mythology, Thoosa, also spelled Thoösa, was, according to Homer, the sea nymph daughter of the primordial sea god Phorcys, and the mother, by Poseidon, of the Cyclops Polyphemus.

Notes

References
 Heubeck, Alfred, J. B. Hainsworth, Stephanie West, A Commentary on Homer's Odyssey: Volume I: Introduction and Books I–VIII, Oxford University Press, 1990. .
 Homer, The Odyssey with an English Translation by A.T. Murray, PH.D. in two volumes. Cambridge, Massachusetts., Harvard University Press; London, William Heinemann, Ltd. 1919. Online version at the Perseus Digital Library.

Nymphs